Union Sportive Sarre-Union is a French association football team founded in 1924, based in the town of Sarre-Union. Their home stadium is the Stade Omnisports in the town. As of the 2017–18 season they play in Championnat National 3, the fifth level in the French football league system.

History
The club was founded in 1924.

After the war, the club played in Troisième Division Départementale and Deuxième Division Départementale, the two lowest divisions of football in Alsace.

As of the 2016–17 season, they play in the Championnat de France Amateur 2 Group D.

Disputed championship

Current squad

References

External links
 
US Sarre Union at footballenfrance.fr 

Sarre-Union
1924 establishments in France
Sport in Bas-Rhin
Football clubs from former German territories
Football clubs in Grand Est